The Hudson Rail Link is a feeder bus system operated by Logan Bus Company for Metro-North Railroad. It connects the Riverdale and Spuyten Duyvil stations on the Hudson Line to the neighborhoods of the same name. Service began in 1991, and route M began in 2002. As of 2014, more than half of the daily commuters who use Spuyten Duyvil station arrive using the feeder bus. Service operates on weekdays only, connecting to and from Metro-North trains. It accepts MetroCard, and UniTickets are available at a discount for rail passengers.

Routes

Fleet

Active Fleet

Retired Fleet
This list is incomplete

References

Bus transportation in New York City
Bus routes in the Bronx